Chris Tse may refer to:
Chris Tse (New Zealand writer) (born 1982), New Zealand poet, short story writer and editor
Chris Tse (Canadian poet) (born 1989), Canadian spoken-word poet, motivational speaker, and hip hop artist